Thermal hydrolysis is a process used for treating industrial waste, municipal solid waste and sewage sludge.

Description
Thermal hydrolysis is a two-stage process combining high-pressure boiling of waste or sludge followed by a rapid decompression. This combined action sterilizes the sludge and makes it more biodegradable, which improves digestion performance. Sterilization destroys pathogens in the sludge resulting in it exceeding the stringent requirements for land application (agriculture).

In addition, the treatment adjusts the rheology to such an extent that loading rates to sludge anaerobic digesters can be doubled, and also dewaterability of the sludge is significantly improved. The first full-scale application of this process for sewage sludge was installed in Hamar, Norway in 1996. Since then, there have been over 30 additional installations globally.

Commercial application at a sewage treatment plant 
Sewage treatment plants, such as Blue Plains in Washington, D.C., USA, have adopted thermal hydrolysis of sewage sludge in order to produce commercially valuable products (such as electricity and high quality biosolid fertilizers) out of the wastewater. The full-scale commercial application of thermal hydrolysis enables the plant to utilize the solids portion of the wastewater to make power and fine fertilizer directly from sewage waste.

Municipal waste-to-fuel application
The city of Oslo, Norway installed a system for converting domestic food waste to fuel in 2012. A thermal hydrolysis system produces biogas from the food waste, which provides fuel for the city bus system and is also used for agricultural fertilizer.

30 largest thermal hydrolysis plants

See also
 List of waste-water treatment technologies

References

Further reading

External links

Biodegradable waste management
Biofuels technology
Chemical reactions
Equilibrium chemistry
Sewerage